Heteroteucha translatella is a moth of the family Oecophoridae. It is found in Australia, where it has been recorded from Queensland, the Australian Capital Territory, Victoria and Tasmania.

The wingspan is about 15 mm. The forewings are yellow with a broad dark edged brown margin and a brown line across the middle. The hindwings are brown.

Life cycle
The larvae feed on Eucalyptus species, including Eucalyptus maculata. They shelter in the dead leaves of their host plant.

References

 

Moths of Australia
Heteroteucha
Moths described in 1864